Main Kab Saas Banoongi is an Indian television series that aired on SAB TV from 1 September 2008.  It was a drama serial about a bahu (daughter-in-law) who became a saas (mother-in-law).

Cast 
 Vandana Pathak as Sheela Devi 
 Rajeev Kumar as Mahesh Kumar
 Bharati Achrekar as Saraswati
 Anil Dhawan as Sant Kumar
 Sachin Chopra as Nagendra Kumar
 Ambika Gandotra as Sonia

References

External links 

Sony SAB original programming
Indian comedy television series
Indian drama television series
2008 Indian television series debuts